
Listed below are executive orders and presidential proclamations signed by United States President Lyndon B. Johnson. His executive orders and presidential proclamations are also listed on WikiSource.

Executive orders

1963

1964

1965

1966

1967

1968

1969

References

External links
 Executive Orders Disposition Tables, National Archives, Federal Register

 
United States federal policy